The Battle of the River Bagradas or Battle of Membresa was an engagement in 536 AD between Byzantine forces under Belisarius and rebel forces under Stotzas. Stotzas had besieged Carthage (capital of the prefecture Africa) shortly before with a force of 8,000 rebels, 1,000 Vandal soldiers (400 had escaped after being captured and sailed back to Africa while the rest were still resisting the Byzantines in Africa), and many slaves. Belisarius had only 2,000 men under his command. Upon Belisarius’ arrival the rebels had lifted the siege. Before battle commenced Stotzas wanted to reposition his troops so the high wind would not aid the Byzantines in the fighting. Stotzas neglected to move any troops to cover this movement. Belisarius, seeing that much of the rebel force was disorganised and exposed, decided to charge the rebels, who almost immediately fled in disorder. Rebel casualties remained relatively light as the Byzantine force was too small to safely chase the fleeing rebels. Instead Belisarius allowed his men to plunder the abandoned rebel camp.

References

Bagradas River
Mutinies
Bagradas River
6th century in Africa
536